Boston Castle is a ward in the Metropolitan Borough of Rotherham, South Yorkshire, England.  The ward contains 39 listed buildings that are recorded in the National Heritage List for England.  Of these, three are listed at Grade I, the highest of the three grades, three are at Grade II*, the middle grade, and the others are at Grade II, the lowest grade.  The ward contains the central part of the town of Rotherham and the area of Moorgate to the south.  The listed buildings include houses and associated structures, churches and a chapel, shop and offices, re-sited Roman remains, a former shooting lodge in the form of a castle, schools, a lamp standard for an oil lamp, a former foundry, mileposts, a public house, a commemorative clock, two war memorials, and a former cinema.


Key

Buildings

References

Citations

Sources

 

Lists of listed buildings in South Yorkshire
Buildings and structures in Rotherham